Beginning with Mysterious Billy Smith to Harry Lewis, the welterweight world champions listed below are more widely recognized in the United States and are not as widely sanctioned as the boxers that follow.  Beginning with boxer Pat Bradley, is a chronological widely recognized List of World Welterweight Boxing Champions, as recognized by four of the better-known sanctioning organizations:

 The World Boxing Association (WBA), founded in 1921 as the National Boxing Association (NBA)
 The World Boxing Council (WBC), founded in 1963
 The International Boxing Federation (IBF), founded in 1983
 The World Boxing Organization (WBO), founded in 1988

Lists of Champions

World claimants

World/Undisputed

WBC

WBA

IBF

WBO

See also
 List of British world boxing champions

References

External links

Welterweight Champions

World boxing champions by weight class